Ludwig-Wilhelm "Lutz" Burckhardt (5 February 1919 – 2 January 1993) was a Luftwaffe ace and recipient of the Knight's Cross of the Iron Cross during World War II.  The Knight's Cross of the Iron Cross was awarded to recognise extreme battlefield bravery or successful military leadership. During his career, he was credited with 69 aerial victories, 16 on the Western Front and 53 on the Eastern Front.

Awards
 Aviator badge
 Front Flying Clasp of the Luftwaffe
 Ehrenpokal der Luftwaffe (19 October 1942)
 Iron Cross (1939)
 2nd Class
 1st Class
 Knight's Cross of the Iron Cross on 15 October 1942 as Leutnant and pilot in the 4./Jagdgeschwader 77

Notes

References

Citations

Bibliography

External links
TracesOfWar.com
Aces of the Luftwaffe
Ritterkreuztraeger 1939-1945

1919 births
1993 deaths
Military personnel from Bremen
German World War II flying aces
Recipients of the Knight's Cross of the Iron Cross
German Air Force personnel